Charles Leweck (born 19 July 1983) is a Luxembourgian footballer, who previously played for FC Etzella Ettelbruck.

Club career
A midfielder, Leweck played for Etzella from 2003 until 2014, after joining them from FC Young-Boys Diekirch.

International career
Leweck made his debut for Luxembourg in 2004 and went on to earn 38 caps, no goal scored. He played in 11 FIFA World Cup qualification matches.

He played his final international game so far in November 2012, a 1–2 friendly defeat by Scotland.

Personal life
He is the younger brother of Alphonse Leweck, who also plays in midfield for Etzella and Luxembourg.

References

External links
 
 

1983 births
Living people
Luxembourgian footballers
FC Etzella Ettelbruck players
Luxembourg international footballers
Association football midfielders